Route 122 is a  southeast-northwest state highway in Massachusetts that is a continuation of Rhode Island Route 122. The highway is signed as south–north.

Route description
Route 122 begins in Blackstone as a continuation of Rhode Island Route 122. The route passes along the Blackstone River through Blackstone and Millville as the main street through both towns. In Uxbridge the route crosses the river before meeting Route 146A at its northern terminus, in front of Uxbridge District Court. In the center of Uxbridge the route intersects Route 16. From there, the route continues northward into Northbridge. Route 122 roughly bisects that town, crossing the Blackstone River again in the northern end of town.

From Northbridge, Route 122 enters the Worcester suburb of Grafton. In the Farnumsville section of town, Route 122A begins, splitting from its parent route and heading west into Sutton. Route 122, meanwhile, continues north, crossing through the center of town before becoming concurrent with Route 140 near Lake Ripple. From there, Route 122 turns west, crossing the corner of Millbury (where Exit 96 of the Mass Pike (old exit 11) meets the route) before entering the city of Worcester.

Once in Worcester, Route 122 meets U.S. Route 20 at an above-grade intersection. It then passes through the southeast corner of town before heading towards downtown. Once there, Route 122 crosses under I-290 at Exit 18 (formerly 14). The route then splits along two one-way streets before meeting Route 122A once more at Kelley Square. The two routes head westward, splitting when Route 122A joins a concurrency with Route 9 and Route 12. Route 122 then continues westward into the town of Paxton.

In Paxton, the route runs concurrently with Route 56 from near Kettle Brook Reservoir Number 4 to the center of town, where Route 56 joins Route 31 for a brief concurrency before those two routes split. Meanwhile, Route 122 heads northwestward past Moore State Park and into the town of Rutland. In Rutland, Route 122A finally ends at its parent route, near Long Pond and Rutland State Park. Route 122 turns westward through the park into the town of Oakham, where Route 122 meets the northern end of Route 148 before turning northward into Barre.

In Barre, Route 122 becomes concurrent with Route 32, continuing through Barre Common (where Route 62 begins) and into Petersham. Near Petersham Center, Route 32 splits from Route 122, and Route 32A crosses the route shortly after. The route also crosses Turnpike Street, the former routing of Route 21 before the creation of the Quabbin Reservoir. In neighboring New Salem (in Franklin County), Route 122 becomes concurrent with U.S. Route 202. Approximately a mile later, the two routes split shortly after entering Orange. Route 122 turns northwest from there, crossing Route 2 at Exit 70 (formerly 15) before finally ending at Route 2A, just north of the Millers River in the center of town.

To celebrate Route 122 North becoming a State Scenic Byway, in October and November 2007, BJ Hill walked the  corridor, beginning in downtown Orange and ending at Worcester State College. Along the way, he filmed the route, step by step, with a shoulder-mounted bullet cam.

Major intersections

References

External links

122